Sir Nicholas Fairfax (1498/99 – 1571), of Gilling Castle and Walton, Yorkshire, was an English politician.

He was born the eldest son of Sir Thomas Fairfax of Gilling Castle and educated at the Middle Temple. He succeeded his father in 1520 and was knighted before 1530.

He was selected High Sheriff of Yorkshire for 1531–32, 1544–1555 and 1561–62.

He was a Member of Parliament (MP) for Scarborough in 1542 and for Yorkshire in 1547 and 1563.

He died in 1571. He had married twice, firstly Jane, the daughter of Guy Palmes of Naburn, with whom he had at least 8 sons and at least 4 daughters and secondly Alice, the daughter of (Sir) John Harington of Exton, Rutland and the widow of Richard Flower of Whitwell, Rutland and of Sir Henry Sutton of Averham, Nottinghamshire. He was succeeded by his eldest son Sir William Fairfax, who was also an MP for Yorkshire and High Sheriff of the county.

References

1499 births
1571 deaths
People from Ryedale (district)
Members of the Middle Temple
Knights Bachelor
Members of the Parliament of England for constituencies in Yorkshire
English MPs 1542–1544
Nicholas
English MPs 1547–1552
English MPs 1563–1567
High Sheriffs of Yorkshire